They Are Among Us is a 2004 American made-for-television science fiction thriller film directed by Jeffrey Obrow, written by , and starring Alison Eastwood,  and .

Premise 
The film is about a town that is populated by aliens who have been posing as humans in order to steal the Earth's resources they need to live when the time comes.

Cast 
 Alison Eastwood – Finley
  - Uncle Bob
 George Buck Flower – Old Chuck
  - Boy's Mother
  - Devon
 Corbin Bernsen – Norbert
 Bruce Boxleitner – Hugh

Reception 

Scott Weinberg at DVDTalk.com gave a negative review: "It's certainly not awful enough to give you a migraine, but They Are Among Us just feels like an oft-told tale, retold (yet again) with very little ingenuity."

References

External links 

 
 

2004 television films
2004 films
2004 horror films
American science fiction horror films
American science fiction thriller films
American science fiction television films
American thriller television films
American horror television films
2000s science fiction horror films
2000s science fiction thriller films
Films directed by Jeffrey Obrow
2000s American films